Orchestia grillus is a species of beach hopper in the family Talitridae. It is found in South America.

References

Gammaridea
Articles created by Qbugbot
Crustaceans described in 1802